A referendum on Prince Karl Ludwig of Hohenzollern-Sigmaringen becoming ruling prince was held in Romania on 20 April 1866. The proposal was approved by 99.97% of the votes cast, and Prince Karl Ludwig was subsequently enthroned as Domnitor with the regnal name Carol I on 23 October. His title was later raised to King of Romania in 1881.

Results

References

1866 referendums
1866 in Romania
Referendums in Romania
Monarchy referendums
April 1866 events